Kyros may refer to:

People
 Kyros of Constantinople (died 712), a saint in the Eastern Orthodox Church and Catholic Church
 Jordan Kyros, Australian ice hockey player in the 2015 AIHL All-Star Weekend
 Kyros Marinis (born 1928), Greek athlete
 Peter Kyros (1925–2012), United States politician

Other uses
 Kyros (band), a British progressive rock band
 Kyros the Overlord, is the ruler of Kyros' Empire and one of the most important characters in the video game Tyranny
 SS Kyros, a coaster ship from Sweden that was sunk in 1917 during World War I

See also
 Cyrus, the Greek form of which is Kyros
 Kyro (disambiguation)